The will to live (German: Wille zum Leben) is a concept developed by the German philosopher Arthur Schopenhauer, representing an irrational "blind incessant impulse without knowledge" that drives instinctive behaviors, causing an endless insatiable striving in human existence, without which the natural world could not exist.

This has nothing to do with the concept of the will to survive used in psychology, which is discussed further below in this article, since Schopenhauer was talking about the basic unit behind doing or thinking anything at all, not the basic drive behind running or fighting under life-threatening conditions (which in his terms would be a dissimulation of the mere blind striving for existence without goal, that is, a theatrical performance of nature in its ever changing forms of matter).

There are significant correlations between the will to live and existential, psychological, social, and physical sources of distress. Many, who overcome near-death experiences with no explanation, have described the will to live as a direct component of their survival. The difference between the wish to die versus the wish to live is also a unique risk factor for suicide.

Concept
In psychology, the will to live is the drive for self-preservation, usually coupled with expectations for future improvement in one's state in life. The will to live is an important concept when attempting to understand and comprehend why we do what we do in order to stay alive, and for as long as we can. This can be related to either one's push for survival on the brink of death, or someone who is just trying to find a meaning to continuing their life. Some researchers say that people who have a reason or purpose in life during such dreadful and horrific experiences will often appear to fare better than those that may find such experiences overwhelming. Every day, people undergo countless types of negative experiences, some of which may be demoralizing, hurtful, or tragic. An ongoing question continues to be what keeps the will to live in these situations. People who claim to have had experiences involving the will to live have different explanations behind it.

Background
The will to live is considered to be a very basic drive in humans; but not necessarily the main driving force. In psychotherapy, Sigmund Freud termed the pleasure principle, which is the seeking of pleasure and avoiding of pain. Viktor Frankl, who spent time in German concentration camps, developed psychotherapy called logotherapy, which may be translated as the therapy focused on the "will to meaning". Maslow's hierarchy of needs highlights the innate appetite that people possess for love and belonging but before all this there is the very basic and powerful will to live.
Psychologists have established that human beings are a goal-oriented species. In assessing the will to live, it should be borne in mind that it could be augmented or diminished by the relative strength of other simultaneously existent drives. Psychologists generally agree that there is the will to live, the will to pleasure, the will to superiority and the will to connection. There are also usually varying degrees of curiosity with regard to what may be termed the will to identity or establishing meaningful personal responses. The will to live is a platform without which it would not be possible to satisfy the other drives. However, this overlooks the possibility that there is a commonality among all creatures that drives all other urges.

Similarity to self-preservation 

Self-preservation is a behavior that ensures the survival of an organism. Pain and fear are integral parts of this mechanism. Pain motivates the individual to withdraw from damaging situations, to protect a damaged body part while it heals, and to avoid similar experiences in the future. Most pain resolves promptly once the painful stimulus is removed and the body has healed, but sometimes pain persists despite removal of the stimulus and apparent healing of the body; and sometimes pain arises in the absence of any detectable stimulus, damage or disease. Fear causes the organism to seek safety and may cause a release of adrenaline, which has the effect of increased strength and heightened senses such as hearing, smell, and sight. Self-preservation may also be interpreted figuratively, in regard to the coping mechanisms one needs to prevent emotional trauma from distorting the mind (see: defence mechanism.)

Even the most simple of living organisms (for example, the single-celled bacteria) are typically under intense selective pressure to evolve a response that would help avoid a damaging environment, if such an environment exists. Organisms also evolve while adapting - even thriving - in a benign environment (for example, a marine sponge modifies its structure in response to current changes, in order to better absorb and process nutrients). Self-preservation is therefore an almost universal hallmark of life. However, when introduced to a novel threat, many species will have a self-preservation response either too specialised, or not specialised enough, to cope with that particular threat. An example is the dodo, which evolved in the absence of natural predators and hence lacked an appropriate, general self-preservation response to heavy predation by humans and rats, showing no fear of them.

Correlations
“Existential, psychiatric, social, and, to a lesser degree, physical variables are highly correlated with the will to live”. Existential issues found to correlate significantly include hopelessness, the desire for death, sense of dignity, and burden to others. Psychiatric issues found to be strongly associated are such as depression, anxiety, and  lack of concentration. Physical issues that showed the strongest associations were appetite and appearance which did not show the same consistent degree of correlation. The four main predictor variables of the will to live changing over time are anxiety, shortness of breath, depression, and sense of well-being which correlate with the other variable predictors as well.  Social variables and quality of life measures are shown to correlate significantly with the will to live such as support and satisfaction with support from family, friends, and health care providers. Findings on the will to live have suggested that psychological variables are replaced by physical mediators of variation as death draws nearer. The will to live has also proven to be highly unstable.

Research
Many studies have been conducted on the theory of the will to live.  Among these studies are subject to the difference in gender and the elderly and also in the terminally ill. One study focused on a simple question that asked about rating one’s will to live and presented the findings that elderly participants reporting a stronger will to live and strengthened or stable will to live survived longer in comparison to those with a weak will to live. This study found that women were able to cope with life-threatening situations, but suggested that the participants could not have been stable and requires future replication. The second study presented the idea of the will to live in the terminally ill specifically cancer patients termed as older. In this study researchers were able to suggest that patients who had tested as having a low sustained will to live died soonest, as opposed to having a moderate level of the will to live, lived the longest while high will to live could affect individuals in any direction. This study needs future replication that can show the effects of will to live in the terminally ill from different diseases and age categories.

Other accounts of the will to live exist in many extreme medical cases, where patients have overcome extraordinary odds to survive. The Holocaust has provided many instances of this phenomenon, and is a good example of this as well. A proposed mechanism for the will to live is the idea that positive mental thinking tends to lower one’s risk for disease and health complications. One study showed that women who thought positively were more likely to carry more antibodies against certain strains of the flu, thus having a stronger immune system than those who were told to think negative thoughts.
Powerful examples of humans having a will to live can be seen in death records throughout history showing that people were more likely to die right after a major holiday, such as Christmas and Thanksgiving, and even birthdays, not actually on or before them, but passing shortly after.

See also
 Antipredator adaptation
 Collective intelligence
 Conatus
 Dear enemy recognition
 Death drive
 Élan vital
 Fight-or-flight response
 Learned helplessness
 Self-defense
 Will to power

References

External links

 Attitude - The Will to Live, Ernest H. Rosenbaum, MD, and Isadora R. Rosenbaum, MA.
 Why life extension?

Ethology
Evolutionary biology
Motivation
Arthur Schopenhauer